Zimovnoy is a rural locality (a khutor) in Ust-Khopyorskoye Rural Settlement, Serafimovichsky District, Volgograd Oblast, Russia. The population was 80 as of 2010. There are 4 streets.

Geography 
Zimovnoy is located on the Don River, 49 km west of Serafimovich (the district's administrative centre) by road. 1-y Bobrovsky is the nearest rural locality.

References 

Rural localities in Serafimovichsky District